Freyung is a town in Bavaria, Germany, capital of the Freyung-Grafenau district. It is situated in the Bavarian Forest mountain range, near the border with Austria and the Czech Republic.

Geography
The town is situated on the southeastern rim of the Bavarian Forest National Park near the confluence of the Saußbach and Reschbach creeks.

History

About 1200 the Passau bishop Wolfger von Erla had Wolfstein Castle erected to control the surrounding estates he had received from the hands of the Hohenstaufen emperor Henry VI. A settlement was laid out beneath the castle which in 1301 was mentioned as Purchstol zu Wolferstein. The later name Freiung denoted the fact that the first settlers were exempt from taxes (cf. Freihaus). The nearby village of Kreuzberg received market rights in 1354, which were transferred to Freyung in 1523.

When the Prince-Bishopric of Passau was secularised in 1803, Freyung passed to the newly established Electorate of Salzburg, but upon the 1805 Peace of Pressburg was incorporated into the Kingdom of Bavaria. It received city rights in 1953.

Twin towns

Freyung is twinned with
 Vimperk, Czech Republic
 Seewalchen am Attersee, Austria

Notable people
Severin Freund (born 1988), ski jumper
Shkemb Miftari (born 1993), footballer

References

Freyung-Grafenau